Saidgai Lake also known as Saidgai Dand is a lake in the upper reaches of Ushirai Dara of Upper Dir District of Khyber Pakhtunkhwa the Province of Pakistan. It is located to the northwest of Gabin Jabba. The temperature is normally about 5 °C to 10 °C during hot months. Mostly this lake catches tourist from Dir and other parts of the country as well in the month of June, July and August, while the remaining months this lake is covered by snow. Saidgai lake is at the boundary of Dir Upper.

Location 
Saidgai Lake is situated in hilly areas of usherai dara, Upper dir, and is about 7-8 hours away by foot from usherai darra. Dwellers of both dir and swat claims the area but geopolitically it comes under dir administration. The lake is encircled by snowy mountains and pastures. The lake is approximately 1 km in length and half km in width, and it’s water run intro stream, later joining the punjkora river of dir.

Access 
The lake is accessible from three different trails and sides; Ushirai Dara, upper Dir (shortest way) which is about 6 hours by foot,  Sulatanr (Roringar valley), upper Swat and Lalko (Gabina Jabba), upper Swat; about 10 to 12 hours.

From Chitkarai the distance by foot is around 4-5 hours.
 The Lalko Gabina Jabba
 Ushirai trail
 Another trail leads to the lake from Sulatanr which is also located in the northern tip of Roringar Matta, Swat.

See also 
Lake Saiful Muluk - Kaghan Valley
Katora Lake - Kumrat Valley
Mahodand Lake - Kalam Valley
Kundol Lake - Kalam Valley
Daral Lake - Swat Valley
Izmis Lake - Swat Valley
Pari Lake - Swat Valley

References 

Lakes of Khyber Pakhtunkhwa
Tourist attractions in Swat
Swat District
Swat Kohistan